Veryovka may refer to:

 Hryhoriy Veryovka (1895–1964) - Soviet and Ukrainian composer and choir director
 Veryovka Ukrainian Folk Choir - founded by and later named for him